Pathé Cinémas is a cinema chain owned by Pathé, with operations in France, the Netherlands, Switzerland, Belgium, and Tunisia. The company is market leader in each country, with the exception of Belgium and Tunisia. It is Europe’s second largest cinema chain.

History
EuroPalaces was formed in 2001 when the French film production and distribution companies Pathé and Gaumont merged their cinema operations, respectively owned by Jérôme Seydoux and Nicolas Seydoux. Gaumont owned 34% and Pathé owned 66% of the shares in the joint venture. In 2010, EuroPalaces was renamed Les Cinémas Gaumont Pathé. On March 1, 2017, it was announced that Gaumont sold its 34% stake in Les Cinémas Gaumont Pathé to Pathé for €380 million, Gaumont wanted to focus more on the production and distribution of content. The name of the company changed shortly thereafter to Les Cinémas Pathé Gaumont, then to Pathé Cinémas in 2023 when Pathé removed the Gaumont brand from its cinemas.

The company grew its circuit with several acquisitions throughout the years, notable acquisitions were MGM Cinemas in 1995, Minerva Cinemas in 2010 in The Netherlands; CinePointCom in 2015 in Belgium; EuropaCorp Cinemas in 2016, CineAlpes in 2019 in France and Euroscoop Cinemas in 2019 in The Netherlands and Belgium. The majority of the acquired cinemas were - or are in the process of being - converted to the Pathé brand. In 2021 Pathé decided to sell three of its recent acquired CineAlpes cinemas to CinéWest.

Until 2010 the company operated several cinemas in Italy, but these locations were sold to due to difficulties in the Italian market.

In 2018, Les Cinémas Pathé Gaumont entered the African market by opening a cinema In Tunis, Tunisia, with plans in progress to open locations in Ivory Coast, Morocco and Senegal.

On October 28, 2021, Pathé Tuschinski - during its centennial - received the Royal Predicate from the Dutch monarch, changing its name to Koninklijk Theater Tuschinski (Royal Theater Tuschinski).

Technologies
The company uses different technologies in their operations, like IMAX. The IMAX Corporation stated that it will strengthen its relationship with Les Cinémas Pathé Gaumont. They will do that by expanding the total number of locations and also by upgrading existing locations to IMAX Laser with IMAX's 12-channel sound technology. The expanding and upgrading will start in 2018 and all locations will be upgraded by 2023, making Les Cinémas Pathé Gaumont the first multi-territory network to be fully powered by IMAX Laser.

The company also partnered with Dolby using their Dolby Atmos and Dolby Cinema products.

In 2017 they partnered with the Korean company CJ 4DPlex to open the first 4DX location in France. During the Cannes Film Festival, it was announced that Les Cinémas Pathé Gaumont will open 30 4DX cinemas throughout France, the Netherlands, Switzerland, and Belgium before 2020. On 22 December 2017 CJ 4DPlex announced in a press release that they have extended their agreement by adding an additional 20 locations, bringing the total to 50.

With the opening of the 500th 4DX location worldwide at Pathé Belle Épine in April 2018, the company announced that they extended their partnership with CJ 4DPlex once with the opening of two ScreenX auditoriums in Paris in June 2018. Additionally, it has installed the first 4DX Screen theater, a combination of 4DX and ScreenX, outside the Asian region in Paris.

Cinemas
A list of all current and future (blue) theaters operated by Pathé Cinémas.

References

External links
 Pathé in France
 Pathé in Senegal
 Pathé in Tunisia
 Pathé in Belgium
 Pathé in Switzerland
 Pathé in The Netherlands

Cinemas and movie theaters chains
2001 establishments in France
Entertainment companies established in 2001
Cinema chains in France
Cinema chains in Belgium